Wilkowa is a small river of Poland. It flows into the Piaskowa southwest of Resko.

Rivers of Poland
Rivers of West Pomeranian Voivodeship